Nein is a village in Israel.

Nein may also refer to:
The Nein, an American indie rock band
The Nein EP, their 2004 recording
Nein, the Japanese band Sound Horizon's 8th major album
Nein, a song by King Gizzard & the Lizard Wizard, see 12 Bar Bruise
Nein, the German word for "no"

Persons with the surname
Henry Nein (1860-1933), an American politician
Jo Nein, pseudonym used by Norwegian writer Nini Roll Anker (1873–1942)
Scott Nein (in office 1991-2004), an American politician
Timothy Nein (in action in 2005), a United States soldier, recipient of Distinguished Service Cross